Michael Arrigan (12 November 1899 – 20 February 1958) was an Irish Gaelic footballer. His championship career at senior level with the Tipperary county team spanned six years from 1920 to 1926.

Arrigan made his debut on the inter-county scene at the age of twenty when he was selected for the Tipperary senior team. He made his debut during the 1920 championship, and was part of the team that won the All-Ireland Senior Football Championship in his debut season. Arrigan also won two Munster medals.

Honours
Tipperary
All-Ireland Senior Football Championship (1): 1920
Munster Senior Football Championship (2): 1920, 1922,

References

1899 births
1958 deaths
Grangemockler Gaelic footballers
20th-century Irish farmers
Tipperary inter-county Gaelic footballers
Winners of one All-Ireland medal (Gaelic football)